NXT TakeOver: Brooklyn III was the 16th NXT TakeOver and third TakeOver: Brooklyn professional wrestling livestreaming event produced by WWE. It was held exclusively for wrestlers from the promotion's NXT brand division. The event aired exclusively on the WWE Network and took place on August 19, 2017, at the Barclays Center in Brooklyn, New York as part of that year's SummerSlam weekend.

Five matches were contested at the event. In the main event, Drew McIntyre defeated Bobby Roode to win the NXT Championship. On the undercard, Asuka retained the NXT Women's Championship against Ember Moon, which was also Asuka’s last match on NXT, and Sanity (represented by Alexander Wolfe and Eric Young) defeated The Authors of Pain (Akam and Rezar) to win the NXT Tag Team Championship. The event is notable for the debut of Adam Cole and the reunion of the team reDRagon after both members Bobby Fish and Kyle O'Reilly made individual debuts on NXT. reDRagon attacked both teams in the tag team championship match after Sanity's victory, then confronted Drew McIntyre during his celebration to serve as a distraction for Cole, who ambushed McIntyre from behind to end the show.

Production

Background
TakeOver was a series of professional wrestling shows that began in May 2014, as WWE's then-developmental league NXT held their second WWE Network-exclusive event, billed as TakeOver. In subsequent months, the "TakeOver" moniker became the brand used by WWE for all of their NXT live specials. Brooklyn III was scheduled as the 16th NXT TakeOver event and was held on August 19, 2017, as a support show for that year's SummerSlam pay-per-view. It was subsequently the third event in the TakeOver: Brooklyn chronology, a subseries of TakeOvers that were held at the Barclays Center in Brooklyn, New York as a support show for WWE's annual SummerSlam pay-per-view.

Storylines

The card comprised five matches. The matches resulted from scripted storylines, where wrestlers portrayed heroes, villains, or less distinguishable characters that built tension and culminated in a wrestling match or series of matches. Results were predetermined by WWE's writers on the NXT brand, while storylines were produced on their weekly television program, NXT.

Event 

In the opening match, Andrade Cien Almas faced Johnny Gargano. In the end, Zelina Vega threw a DIY shirt at Gargano, allowing Almas to perform a shotgun dropkick and a hammerlock DDT on Gargano for the win.

Next, The Authors of Pain (Akam and Rezar) defended the NXT Tag Team Championship against Sanity (Alexander Wolfe and Killian Dain). During the match, Eric Young replaced Dain as a legal participant. In the climax, Dain performed a running crossbody through a table on Akam, who was holding Nikki Cross. Wolfe and Young performed a belly to back suplex/diving neckbreaker combination on Rezar to win the titles, thus ending the Authors of Pain's undefeated streak since their debut. After the match, Bobby Fish and Kyle O'Reilly attacked Sanity and The Authors of Pain, performing "Chasing The Dragon" and "Total Elimination" on Young.

After that, Aleister Black faced Hideo Itami. Black performed "Black Mass" on Itami to win the match.

Later, Asuka defended the NXT Women's Championship against Ember Moon. Moon performed the "Eclipse" on Asuka for a near-fall. Asuka forced Moon to submit to the "Asuka Lock" to retain the title.

Main event 
In the main event, Bobby Roode defended the NXT Championship against Drew McIntyre. McIntyre performed a "Future Shock" on Roode for a near-fall. McIntyre performed a "Claymore" on Roode, who placed his foot on the bottom rope to void the pinfall at a two count. Roode performed a "Glorious DDT" on McIntyre for a near-fall. Roode performed a second "Glorious DDT" on McIntyre and attempted a third "Glorious DDT" but McIntyre countered. McIntyre performed a Glasgow Kiss and a second "Claymore" on Roode to win the title and to give Roode his first televised loss in NXT. After the match, reDRagon appeared and distracted McIntyre. Adam Cole, making his debut, attacked McIntyre along with reDRagon and performed a superkick on McIntyre. Cole hoisted the NXT Championship as the event ended.

Aftermath 
On the August 22 episode of SmackDown Live, 
Bobby Roode made his main roster debut by defeating Aiden English. On August 24, Asuka relinquished the NXT Women's Championship due to a collarbone injury sustained during her match with Moon, thus ending her record-breaking reign. Her reign lasted 510 days (WWE recognizes her reign as lasting 523 days due to the episode airing on tape delay on September 6, 2017). On the September 11 episode of Raw, a video promo aired announcing Asuka's main roster debut.

Results

References

External links 

Brooklyn 3
2017 in New York City
2017 WWE Network events
Events in Brooklyn, New York
Professional wrestling in New York City
August 2017 events in the United States